Mountain Moonlight is a 1941 American comedy film directed by Nick Grinde and written by Mauri Grashin, John W. Krafft, Dorrell McGowan and Stuart E. McGowan. The film stars the vaudeville comedy troupe the Weaver Brothers and Elviry, with Betty Jane Rhodes, John Archer and Kane Richmond. The film was released on July 12, 1941, by Republic Pictures.

Plot

Cast 
Leon Weaver as Abner Weaver
Frank Weaver as Cicero Weaver
June Weaver as Elviry Weaver
Betty Jane Rhodes as Carol Weaver
John Archer as Dr. Ed
Kane Richmond as Paul Conrad
Frank Sully as Bill Jackson
Johnny Arthur as Holbrook
Loretta Weaver as Violey Weaver
George Ernest as Johnny Weaver
Andrew Tombes as Sen. Marvin
George Chandler as Steve Brown
Harry Hayden as Lawyer Talbot
Roscoe Ates as Gardener
Leonard Carey as Briggs
George Meeker as Long
Edwin Stanley as Randolph

References

External links 
 

1941 films
1940s English-language films
American comedy films
1941 comedy films
Republic Pictures films
Films directed by Nick Grinde
American black-and-white films
1940s American films